Jamie Gillan Greene (born 19 March 1980) is a Scottish politician who is a Member of the Scottish Parliament (MSP) for the West Scotland region from 2016. A member of the Scottish Conservatives, he has served as Shadow Cabinet Secretary for Justice since 2021.

Early life and career 
Greene was born in Greenock, Inverclyde, and holds dual British and Canadian citizenship. He was educated at James Watt College in the town. Prior to his election he worked in the broadcast, media and digital technology industries, most recently as a senior executive for the multinational broadcast network Viacom International.

Political career 
In the 2015 United Kingdom general election, Greene stood for the UK Parliament as the Conservative candidate for North Ayrshire and Arran where he came third.

In 2016, Greene stood for the Scottish Parliament as the Conservative candidate for the Cunninghame North constituency where he came second, then as second on the West Scotland regional list for the Scottish Conservatives.

In September 2019 it was announced he had been selected to stand for the 2021 Scottish Parliamentary election for the Cunninghame North seat.

In the 2021 Scottish Parliamentary election Greene came second in the Cunninghame North seat achieving 10,451 votes, an increase of 3.5% from the 2016 election.

He was elected to the Scottish Parliament in 2021 on the West Scotland regional list for the Scottish Conservatives to serve a second term in office.

Greene was appointed as Shadow Cabinet Secretary for Justice in the current term of Parliament.

In the last term (Term 5) of the Scottish Parliament, Greene served as Shadow Cabinet Secretary for Education and Skills. Previously he held the role of Shadow Cabinet Secretary for Transport, Infrastructure and Connectivity.

Prior to this he previously held roles as the Scottish Conservative spokesperson for transport and infrastructure, technology, connectivity and the digital economy as well as digital broadcasting. He sat on the Education and Skills committee having previously sat on the Rural Economy and Connectivity Committee, the Equalities and Human Rights and Culture, Tourism, Europe and External Affairs Committees respectively of the Scottish Parliament.

After his election in Term 5 of the Scottish Parliament (2016–21) he also instigated and was Co-Convenor of the Scottish Parliaments' first Cross-Party-Group (CPG) on LGBTI+ issues. He is also an active member of the Commonwealth Parliamentary Association (CPA) and has represented the Scottish Parliament on a number of engagements serving in parliamentary training and election monitoring functions.

Greene initially expressed an interest in standing for the 2020 Scottish Conservative & Unionist Party Leadership Election, but announced in January 2020 that he was dropping-out to support incumbent acting-leader Jackson Carlaw who was later replaced by Douglas Ross.

Personal life 
Greene is openly gay and heads Holyrood's LGBT+ Cross Party Group jointly with Emma Roddick.

References

External links 

 

Living people
Place of birth missing (living people)
Scottish Conservative Party councillors
Conservative MSPs
Members of the Scottish Parliament 2016–2021
Scottish television producers
People from Greenock
Scottish television executives
1980 births
Scottish Conservative Party parliamentary candidates
Gay politicians
Members of the Scottish Parliament 2021–2026
LGBT members of the Scottish Parliament